Adrian Carlos Uter (born October 27, 1984) is a Jamaican professional basketball player who last played for Vaqueros de Bayamón of the Baloncesto Superior Nacional (BSN).

Professional career
On June 27, 2016, Uter signed with ASVEL Basket of the LNB Pro A.

On December 30, 2019, he signed with Goyang Orions of the Korean Basketball League.

National team career
Uter represents the senior Jamaican national team in international competitions.

References

External links
EuroCup Profile
FIBA Profile
Basketball-Reference.com Profile
Italian League Profile 
Eurobasket.com Profile
Sports-Reference.com NCAA College Stats

1984 births
Living people
AS Monaco Basket players
ASVEL Basket players
Caciques de Humacao players
Goyang Carrot Jumpers players
Hapoel Eilat basketball players
Hapoel Tel Aviv B.C. players
Hofstra Pride men's basketball players
Jamaican expatriate basketball people in Israel
Jamaican men's basketball players
Leones de Ponce basketball players
Maccabi Rishon LeZion basketball players
Moadon Kadursal HaBikaa players
Pallacanestro Cantù players
Plateros de Fresnillo players
Power forwards (basketball)
Saint-Vallier Basket Drôme players
Swans Gmunden players
American expatriate basketball people in Mexico
Jamaican expatriate basketball people in Mexico
Sportspeople from Queens, New York
Basketball players from New York City
American expatriate basketball people in Austria
American expatriate basketball people in Portugal
American expatriate basketball people in Italy
American expatriate basketball people in Israel
American expatriate basketball people in Monaco
American expatriate basketball people in France
American expatriate basketball people in South Korea
Jamaican expatriate basketball people in Austria
Jamaican expatriate basketball people in Portugal
Jamaican expatriate basketball people in Italy
Jamaican expatriate basketball people in Monaco
Jamaican expatriate basketball people in France
Jamaican expatriate basketball people in South Korea